Now is the fifth studio album by Canadian singer and songwriter Shania Twain and her first in 15 years. It was released on September 29, 2017 by Mercury Nashville. The album was produced by Twain alongside Ron Aniello, Jake Gosling, Jacquire King and Matthew Koma. Following a severely weakened singing voice caused by Lyme disease and dysphonia, Twain took an indefinite hiatus from music beginning in the mid-2000s, and at one point was unsure if she would ever be able to sing again. Following intense vocal rehabilitation and a successful concert residency in Las Vegas, Shania: Still the One, she began planning a new studio album in 2013. Written solely by Twain, Now is her first studio album in which she assumed an integral role in its production, co-producing every track. It is also Twain's first album since her 1993 self-titled debut studio album to not be co-written with or produced by her ex-husband Robert John "Mutt" Lange.

Her first studio album since Up! (2002), Twain has named Now her most personal album. The album received mixed reviews from music critics, with some complimenting the album's production and Twain's long-awaited return to music, while others criticized her vocals and the album's lyrics. Now debuted at number one on the Billboard 200, Canadian Albums and Top Country Albums charts and has since reached number one in several countries worldwide, as well as being certified platinum in Canada. Four singles, "Life's About to Get Good", "Swingin' With My Eyes Closed", "Who's Gonna Be Your Girl" and "We Got Something They Don't", were released in promotion for the album. The first two singles, "Life's About to Get Good" and "Swingin' With My Eyes Closed", as well as the unreleased track "Soldier", were all given music videos. Twain further promoted the album with television performances, festival appearances, interviews, and the successful Now Tour in 2018.

Background
After releasing the compilation album Greatest Hits in 2004, Twain released the single "Shoes" for the soundtrack to the television series Desperate Housewives. Later, experiencing the breakdown of her marriage, Twain divorced her longtime husband and songwriting partner, music producer Robert John "Mutt" Lange, in 2008. She remarried to Frédéric Thiébaud, the husband of her former best friend, in 2011. The same year, she released the promotional single "Today Is Your Day", which had a moderate impact on the charts.

Twain underwent vocal therapy after being diagnosed with dysphonia and Lyme disease, which caused her to nearly lose her singing voice; she embarked on a concert tour and Las Vegas residency before revealing that new music would arrive in 2017.

Singles
Twain premiered "Life's About to Get Good", the album's lead single, at the Stagecoach Festival in April 2017 before officially releasing it as a single on June 15, 2017. The single debuted and peaked at number 36 on the US Billboard Country Airplay chart. A music video for the song, directed by Matthew Cullen, was released in July. "Swingin' With My Eyes Closed" was released as the second single from Now on August 18, 2017, later accompanied by a music video. "We Got Something They Don't" was released as the third single from the album on October 30, 2017, followed by "Who's Gonna Be Your Girl" as the fourth single on December 17.

Two tracks from Now were released as promotional singles ahead of the album's release: "Poor Me" was released as the first promotional single on July 20, 2017, accompanied by an official lyric video, followed by "We Got Something They Don't" on September 15.

Critical reception

Now received mixed reviews from music critics. At Metacritic, the album received a weighted score of 58 out of 100 from review aggregate website Metacritic, indicating "mixed or average reviews", based on 11 reviews from music critics. 

Robert Crawford of Rolling Stone called the album "dramatic and diverse", but affirms "Now continues the exploration we last saw with 2002's Up!." Sounds Like Nashville's Annie Reuter says "Twain proves herself relevant on Now", noting the production of the album as a standout piece. "[A] cutting-edge production that reminds the listener exactly why she is the best-selling female country artist of all time," 

Sputnikmusic gave the album 4/5, claiming "There isn’t a bad song on "Now". In a perfect world this album will pop up on a number of end of year top 10 lists. But as it is Shania's body of modern work will have to settle for being recognized as the best pop-country/Americana record to come out so far this decade. It's a welcome return to form for one of the best voices working in any genre." Conversely, Mikael Wood of the Los Angeles Times criticized Twain's vocal delivery on the uptempo tracks as "flat and robotic", 

The Wall Street Journal writer Barry Mazor says the album finds Twain "singing in a somewhat lower register—audible, but not dramatically different." Mazor also praised Twain's sonic direction saying, "If it was commonly suggested during her hit run that the sounds and video images were manipulative concoctions developed by Mr. Lange, and Ms. Twain was merely his puppet, that charge is certainly well-debunked now.

Commercial performance
Now debuted at number one in the United Kingdom, becoming her second album to top the UK Albums Chart after
Come On Over. It also entered at the top position in Australia, becoming her third album after Come On Over and Up! to reach the summit of the ARIA Albums Chart. In the United States, it opened atop the Billboard 200 with 137,000 album-equivalent units, which included 134,000 album sales, and became her second number-one album in the country after Up!. Now descended to number 29 the next week, earning 15,000 album-equivalent units and selling 14,000 copies.  As of August 2018 the album had sold 233,800 copies in the United States.

The record additionally debuted at number one on the Canadian Albums Chart with 72,000 copies sold and 73,000 album-equivalent units in its first week, becoming Canada's biggest album opening since Drake's Views (2016) and her fourth entry to reach its summit after Come On Over, Up!, and Greatest Hits. As of December 2017 the album has sold 106,000 copies in Canada, making it the best selling Canadian CD that year.

Track listing
All tracks are written by Twain.

Personnel
Adapted from AllMusic.

Vocals
Shania Twain – lead vocals, background vocals
Dan Book – background vocals
Matthew Koma – background vocals
Jason Wade – background vocals

Musicians

David Angell – violin
Ron Aniello – acoustic guitar, baritone guitar, bass, drums, electric guitar, hammer, keyboards, organ, piano, Rhodes piano, synthesizer, synthesizer strings, Wurlitzer
Jimmy Baldwin – tenor saxophone 
Eli Beaird – bass
Roy Bittan – piano
Dan Book – keyboards
Rogét Chahayed – piano, synthesizer
Matt Chamberlain – drums
Jude Cole – acoustic guitar
Max Collins – bass, drums
Adam Coltman – handclapping
Tom Culm – handclapping
Eric Darken – chimes, percussion, vibraphone
David Davidson – violin
George Deoring – ukulele
Kris Donegan – acoustic guitar, electric guitar, tiple
Ian Fitchuk – drums, organ, piano
Michael Freeman – electric guitar 
Matthew Gooderham – handclapping
Jake Gosling – drums, Güiro, handclapping, organ, Rhodes piano, percussion, piano, synthesizer, tambourine
Peter Gosling – piano
Matthew Koma – acoustic guitar, bass, electric guitar, synthesizer, vocoder
Tim Lauer – keyboards, mellotron, strings
Greg Leisz – dobro, pedal steel
Chris Leonard – acoustic guitar, electric guitar, handclapping
Darrell Leonard – flugelhorn 
Kris Mazzarisi – drums
Andy Nixon – drums
Dave Palmer – piano
Noam Pikelny – banjo  
Kaveh Rastegar – bass
Hilda Sarighani Reis – cello
Steve Richards – cello
Leif Shires – trumpet
Spencer Thomson – electric guitar, keyboards
Shania Twain – electric guitar, keyboards, handclapping
Oscar Utterström – trombone
Mike Viola – electric guitar
Chris West – baritone saxophone
Kristin Wilkinson – viola
Gabe Witcher – violin

Production and imagery

Mert Alas – photography 
Ron Aniello – producer, programming, string arrangements 
Giovanni Bianco – creative director 
Dan Book – editing, engineer, producer, programming, vocal producer
Sean Budum – assistant
Eric Darken – programming
Michael Freeman – assistant 
Lauren Goldblum – creative art
Jake Gosling – engineer, producer, programming
Nicole Kim – graphic design
Jackson King – assistant
Jacquire King – assistant, producer, programming
Matthew Koma – arranger, producer, programming, vocal producer
Rob Lebret – engineer
Kolton Lee – assistant
Jordan Lehning – horn arrangement  
Brian Lucey – mastering
Clif Norrell – engineer
Danny Pellegrini – assistant
Ross Petersen – engineer
Michael Peterson – assistant
Brian Phillips – editing
Marcus Piggott – photography
Cheyanne Proud – graphic design
Lowell Reynolds – engineer
Olle Romo – engineer, programming
Mark "Spike" Stent – mixing
Geoff Swan – assistant
Spencer Thomson – programming
Matt Tuggle – engineer
Shania Twain – producer, programming 
Sadaharu Yagi – engineer

Charts

Weekly charts

Year-end charts

Certifications

Release history

References

2017 albums
Albums produced by Ron Aniello
Albums produced by Jake Gosling
Mercury Nashville albums
Shania Twain albums
Canadian Country Music Association Top Selling Canadian Album albums